My Eyes Have Seen is a studio album by American folk singer Odetta, first released in July 1959. It is the first record by Odetta to be released by Vanguard Records.

Milt Okun arranged and conducted a choir on a portion of the songs, notably "Motherless Children", "Ox-Driver Song" and the title piece.

My Eyes Have Seen was re-released on CD in 1994.

Reception

In his review for Allmusic, critic Ronnie D. Lankford wrote of the album, "While it might be hard for a post-millennium roots fan to understand, Odetta—in her heyday—was the kind of folk artist who drove purists crazy.... My Eyes Have Seen is a nice portrait of a performer bucking conformity as she stretches her artistic legs a bit.."

Track listing
All songs Traditional unless otherwise noted.
 "Poor Little Jesus" – 1:54
 "Bald Headed Woman" – 2:20
 "Motherless Children" – 2:10
 "I Know Where I'm Going" – 2:00
 "The Foggy Dew" (Canon Charles O’Neill) – 5:29
 "I've Been Driving on Bald Mountain/Water Boy" (Avery Robinson) – 6:54
 "Ox-Driver Song" – 2:35
 "Down on Me" – 2:55
 "Saro Jane" – 2:45
 "Three Pigs" – 1:18
 "No More Cane on the Brazos" – 3:38
 "Jumpin' Judy" – 2:26
 "Battle Hymn of the Republic" (Julia Ward Howe) – 3:52

Personnel
Odetta Holmes – vocals, guitar
Bill Lee – bass

References

1959 albums
Odetta albums
Vanguard Records albums
Albums conducted by Milt Okun
Albums arranged by Milt Okun